Paul Dombrecht (born 1948, Ostend) is a Belgian oboist performing on period instruments as well as the modern oboe. He appears frequently with other prominent musicians and baroque orchestras.

He is the son of Stefaan Dombrecht, who was organist at Oostende. In addition to being an oboist, Paul Dombrecht is active as conductor and artistic director of the baroque orchestra Il Fondamento, the wind ensemble Octophoros and the Paul Dombrecht Consort.

Paul Dombrecht is also a virtuoso on the modern oboe, performing the complete repertoire for the instrument, including the nineteenth and twentieth centuries.

Paul Dombrecht has an extensive discography with recordings made for the music labels Seon, Harmonia Mundi, Astrée, Opus 111, Accent, Vanguard, Passacaille and Fuga Libera.

He is a professor at the Royal Conservatory of Brussels and regularly teaches masterclasses in Spain, Italy, Turkey, Germany, Greece and Israel.

Partial discography
 Juan Crisóstomo Arriaga (1806–1826). O salutaris Hostia. Stabat Mater dolorosa. Air d’Oedipe à Colone. Herminie. Air de Médée. Duo de Ma Tante Aurore. Agar dans le desert. Il Fondamento, Paul Dombrecht. Fuga Libera FUG515. 2005

References

1948 births
Living people
Belgian classical oboists
Male oboists
People from Ostend